Adair County High School is a United States high school (grades 9 to 12) in the small town of Columbia, Adair County, Kentucky. It is the only high school of the county.

References

External links
 Adair County High School website

Schools in Adair County, Kentucky
Public high schools in Kentucky
Columbia, Kentucky